The Fiji women's national rugby league team (Fiji Bulikula) represent Fiji in international rugby league football competitions.

Current squad
Inaugural test vs Papua New Guinea;

Timaima Ravisa
Roela Radiniyavuni
Patricia Raikadroka
Tanika Marshall
Limaina Wai
Teaghan Hartigan
Sereana Naitokatoka
Canecia Sims
Ateca Laiyamo
Tokasa Lomalagi
Talei Holmes
Josephine Maejiirs
Eloise Vunakece
Vilisi Vakaloloma
Losena Qiolevu
Merewairita Nai
Asena Rokomarama

Results

Full internationals

Other International Matches

Nines

References

Women's national rugby league teams
Women's national sports teams of Fiji